Horst Siegl (born 15 February 1969) is a Czech former professional footballer who played as a striker.  He played for Czechoslovakia and later Czech Republic, for both he played total 23 matches and scored 7 goals. He played two matches for the Czech Republic in the 1997 FIFA Confederations Cup.

In total, Horst Siegl scored 176 league goals in 448 games (265/128 Sparta, 39/7 Cheb, 13/0 1.FC Kaiserslautern, 84/25 Příbram, 13/5 Plzeň, 34/11 Most).

Honours
Sparta Prague
 Czechoslovak First League: 1987–88, 1988–89, 1990–91, 1992–93
Czech First League (7): 1993–94, 1994–95, 1996–97, 1997–98, 1998–99, 1999–00, 2000–01

1. FC Kaiserslautern
 DFB-Pokal: 1996

Czech Republic
 FIFA Confederations Cup third place: 1997

Individual
 Czech First League top scorer: 1993–94, 1996–97, 1997–98, 1998–99.
 Czech First League second all-time top scorer

References

External links
 

1969 births
Living people
People from Ostrov (Karlovy Vary District)
Czech people of German descent
Sportspeople from the Karlovy Vary Region
Czechoslovak footballers
Czech footballers
Association football forwards
AC Sparta Prague players
FK Hvězda Cheb players
FC Viktoria Plzeň players
FK Baník Most players
1. FK Příbram players
1. FC Kaiserslautern players
Bundesliga players
Czech First League players
Czechoslovakia international footballers
Czech Republic international footballers
1997 FIFA Confederations Cup players
Czech expatriate footballers
Czech expatriate sportspeople in Germany
Expatriate footballers in Germany